Lucky Jo is a 1964 French crime film directed by Michel Deville and starring Eddie Constantine, Pierre Brasseur and Christiane Minazzoli.

Cast
 Eddie Constantine as Christopher "Lucky Jo" Jowett
 Pierre Brasseur as Le commissaire Loudéac
 Georges Wilson as Simon Archambaut
 Christiane Minazzoli as Adeline Archambaut
 Jean-Pierre Darras as Napo
 André Cellier as Gabriel Farkas
 Christian Barbier as Le commissaire Odile
 Claude Brasseur as Loudéac Junior
 Françoise Arnoul as Mimi Perrin
 Anouk Ferjac as The woman at the bar

References

Bibliography
 Parish, Robert. Film Actors Guide. Scarecrow Press, 1977.

External links
 

1964 films
1960s crime comedy films
1960s French-language films
French black-and-white films
Films directed by Michel Deville
French crime comedy films
1960s French films